Richard Wahle (February 14, 1857, Vienna – October 21, 1935, Vienna) was professor of philosophy at the Universities of Czernowitz and Vienna.

Wahle pronounced in his Tragicomedy of Wisdom (2nd edition, 1925) on what he acknowledged as only "definite, agnostic, absolute critique of knowledge" and psychology as surviving, or rather maintained that critiques of knowledge, logic and psychology have nothing to do with philosophy. As a consequence of his fundamental attitude, Wahle did not recognize the ego as a nucleus of forces but only as an imprint in the texture of the universe.

In his Formation of Character (2nd edition, 1928) Wahle made important contributions to modern characterology. Wahle's devastating criticism of philosophers spared only a few, including Spinoza, Hamann and Herbart, in whom he praised usefulness.

Works 
 Gehirn und Bewusstsein, 1884
 Die geometrische Methode des Spinoza, 1888
 Das Ganze der Philosophie und ihr Ende, 1894
 Über den Mechanismus des geistigen Lebens, 1906
 Grundlagen einer neuen Psychiatrie, 1931

External links 
 AEIOU

1857 births
1935 deaths
19th-century Austrian people
20th-century Austrian people
19th-century philosophers
20th-century Austrian philosophers
Jewish philosophers
Academic staff of the University of Vienna
Academic staff of Chernivtsi University
Austrian Jews
Writers from Vienna